The Old Royal Naval College is the architectural centrepiece of Maritime Greenwich, a World Heritage Site in Greenwich, London, described by the United Nations Educational, Scientific and Cultural Organisation (UNESCO) as being of "outstanding universal value" and reckoned to be the "finest and most dramatically sited architectural and landscape ensemble in the British Isles". The site is managed by the Greenwich Foundation for the Old Royal Naval College, established in 1997 to conserve the buildings and grounds and convert them into a cultural destination. The buildings were originally constructed to serve as the Royal Hospital for Seamen at Greenwich, now generally known as Greenwich Hospital, chartered by King William III and Queen Mary II on 25 October 1694, designed by Christopher Wren, and built between 1696 and 1712. The hospital closed in 1869. Between 1873 and 1998 it was the Royal Naval College, Greenwich.

Origins of the site

This was originally the site of Bella Court, built by Humphrey, Duke of Gloucester, and subsequently renamed Palace of Placentia by Margaret of Anjou upon its confiscation. Rebuilt by Henry VII, it was thenceforth more commonly known as Greenwich Palace. As such, it was the birthplace of Tudor monarchs Henry VIII, Mary I, and Elizabeth I, and reputedly the favourite palace of Henry VIII. The palace fell into disrepair during the English Civil War. With the exception of the incomplete John Webb building, the palace was finally demolished in 1694.

Greenwich Hospital

In 1692 the Royal Hospital for Seamen at Greenwich was created on the site on the instructions of Mary II, who had been inspired by the sight of wounded sailors returning from the Battle of La Hogue. Architectural highlights included the Chapel and the Painted Hall. The Painted Hall was painted between 1707 and 1726 by Sir James Thornhill. The hospital closed in 1869 and the remains of thousands of sailors and officers were removed from the hospital site in 1875 and reinterred in East Greenwich Pleasaunce or "Pleasaunce Park".

Royal Naval College, Greenwich

In 1873, four years after the hospital closed, the buildings were converted to a training establishment for the Royal Navy. The Royal Navy finally left the College in 1998 when the site passed into the hands of the Greenwich Foundation for the Old Royal Naval College.

Greenwich Foundation for the Old Royal Naval College
Since 1998, the site has had new life breathed into it through a mix of new uses and activities and a revival of the historic old site under the management and control of the Greenwich Foundation. The buildings are Grade I listed. In 1999 some parts of Queen Mary and King William, and the whole of Queen Anne and the Dreadnought Building were leased for 150 years by the University of Greenwich. In 2000 Trinity College of Music leased the major part of King Charles. This created a unique new educational and cultural mix.

In 2002, the Foundation realised its aim of opening up the whole site to visitors. It opened the Painted Hall, the Chapel and the grounds and a Visitor Centre to the public daily, free of charge, with guided tours available. The Old Royal Naval College became open to students and visitors of all ages and nationalities accompanied often by music wafting from Trinity College. As Nathaniel Hawthorne wrote in 1863, "the people are sooner or later the legitimate inheritors of whatever beauty kings and queens create".

In 2005, the room where Nelson's coffin was held prior to his being laid-in-state was opened as the Nelson Room. The little side room contains a statue of Nelson replicating the one in Trafalgar Square, memorabilia, paintings and information. It can be seen on one of the guided tours that also include a visit to the undercrofts, the old skittle alley and crypt. A service is held in the chapel every Sunday at 11 am which is open to all. Public concerts are regularly held here and a wide variety of business and cultural events are held in the Painted Hall. The area is used by visitors, students, local people and film crews in a traffic-free environment that provides a variety of coffee shops, bars and restaurants, all incorporated within the old buildings, as part of a unique "ancient and modern" blend that support 21st century life in Greenwich.

The Old Royal Naval College and the "Maritime Greenwich" World Heritage site are becoming focal points for a wide range of business and community activities. Trinity College of Music provide a wide range of musicians and ensembles on a subsidised commercial basis to play at events throughout East London and beyond, part of their business and community “out-reach” policy encouraged and part-funded by the Higher Education Funding Council.

The site is regularly used for filming television programmes, television advertisements, and feature films. Productions have included The Bounty, where captain William Bligh portrayed by Anthony Hopkins is brought in a Chariot at the start of the film, and judged during subsequent scenes. Patriot Games, where an attack on a fictional royal family member, Lord Holmes, was filmed, as well as Shanghai Knights, and a 2006 television advertisement campaign for the British food and clothing retailer Marks & Spencer. Other films include Four Weddings and a Funeral, The Madness of King George, The Mummy Returns, The Avengers (1998) and Lara Croft: Tomb Raider (2001).

More recent filming has included BBC television's spy-drama Spooks and the dramatisation of Little Dorrit, David Cronenberg's film Eastern Promises, the film adaptation of Philip Pullman's novel Northern Lights and The Wolf Man (2009). The grounds were used extensively during the filming of 2006's Amazing Grace, and 2011's Sherlock Holmes: A Game of Shadows, Now You See Me 2 and Pirates of the Caribbean: On Stranger Tides. Scenes were shot at the grounds for The King's Speech, where the site doubled for Buckingham Palace, and The Dark Knight Rises, where it doubled for a cafe in the film's final scenes. In April 2012 the site was used for the iconic barricade scenes in the film adaption of the musical Les Miserables. In October 2012 the college was used for filming Thor: The Dark World. In October 2013 the college was used as a set for The Man from U.N.C.L.E.. Also Guy Richie's 2005 film Revolver filmed a scene there.

Painted Hall project
In 2014, the Old Royal Naval College announced that it was embarking on the next stage of its ambitious plans to restore the Painted Hall. Over three years 3,700 m2 of Thornhill’s masterpiece was to be conserved. The conservation project focused on the Lower Hall (the Upper Hall having been conserved in 2013). The project included a unique series of public 'ceiling tours' allowing members of the public to get up close to the painted ceiling and see conservators at work. In March 2019, the hall reopened to the public, the project winning awards.

Gallery

See also

Greenwich Hospital Act
Discover Greenwich Visitor Centre on the Old Royal Naval College site

References

External links 

 
 University of Greenwich
 Trinity Laban Conservatoire of Music and Dance – Music Faculty
 Greenwich World Heritage Site
 Photos from the conversion

1998 disestablishments in England
Buildings by Colen Campbell
Christopher Wren church buildings in London
Christopher Wren buildings in London
Cultural and educational buildings in London
Defunct universities and colleges in London
Educational institutions disestablished in 1998
English Baroque architecture
Grade I listed buildings in the Royal Borough of Greenwich
Grade I listed hospital buildings
History of the Royal Borough of Greenwich
Infrastructure completed in 1705
Infrastructure completed in 1742
Military history of London
Naval museums in London
Military-related organizations
Museums in the Royal Borough of Greenwich
Nicholas Hawksmoor buildings
Royal buildings in London
Royal Naval College, Greenwich
University of Greenwich
1705 establishments in England
Maritime Greenwich